Lischkeia miranda is a species of sea snail, a marine gastropod mollusk in the family Eucyclidae.

Description

Distribution
This species occurs in European waters.

References

 Locard A. (1897–1898). Expéditions scientifiques du Travailleur et du Talisman pendant les années 1880, 1881, 1882 et 1883. Mollusques testacés. Paris, Masson. vol. 1 [1897], p. 1–516 pl. 1–22; vol. 2 [1898], p. 1–515, pl. 1–18 
 Gofas, S.; Le Renard, J.; Bouchet, P. (2001). Mollusca, in: Costello, M.J. et al. (Ed.) (2001). European register of marine species: a check-list of the marine species in Europe and a bibliography of guides to their identification. Collection Patrimoines Naturels, 50: pp. 180–213

External links

miranda
Gastropods described in 1898